Jeff Lemans McInnis (born October 22, 1974) is an American former professional basketball player. He played in the National Basketball Association (NBA), in Greece and in the Continental Basketball Association (CBA).

Playing career

After his junior year playing for the University of North Carolina at Chapel Hill, McInnis was chosen by the Denver Nuggets in the second round of the 1996 NBA Draft. He played three seasons for the Quad City Thunder of the Continental Basketball Association (CBA) from 1997 to 2000. He was selected as the CBA Newcomer of the Year and named to the All-CBA Second Team and All-Defensive Team in 1998. He was chosen as the CBA Most Valuable Player and a member of the All-CBA First Team in 2000.

All together, during his NBA career, McInnis would play for the Nuggets, the New Jersey Nets, the Cleveland Cavaliers, the Portland Trail Blazers, the Los Angeles Clippers, and the Washington Wizards.

For the 2005–06 season, the New Jersey Nets acquired McInnis, a free agent, mainly to back up star point guard Jason Kidd. McInnis played limited minutes, tore left-knee cartilage on January 15, and missed significant time.

Ahead of his return for the 2006 playoffs, the Nets kept McInnis inactive.  The team's attempts to negotiate a contract buyout or a trade before the new season were unsuccessful, leaving McInnis in limbo, on the roster but exiled, early in the 2006–07 season.

On January 3, 2007, the Charlotte Bobcats received McInnis from the Nets in trade for Bernard Robinson and cash considerations. McInnis, who would play 38 games for Charlotte, averaging 4.3 points and 3.3 assists per game, was waived by the Bobcats on February 29, 2008.

Coaching career 
In 2009, McInnis founded the AAU organization Team Charlotte. In 2015, he won 17U National Coach of the Year honors. In 2019, he became national head basketball coach at Combine Academy in Lincolnton, North Carolina. His stint there ended in 2022.

Notes

1974 births
Living people
African-American basketball players
American expatriate basketball people in Greece
American men's basketball players
Basketball players from Charlotte, North Carolina
Charlotte Bobcats players
Cleveland Cavaliers players
Denver Nuggets draft picks
Denver Nuggets players
Los Angeles Clippers players
McDonald's High School All-Americans
New Jersey Nets players
North Carolina Tar Heels men's basketball players
Oak Hill Academy (Mouth of Wilson, Virginia) alumni
Panionios B.C. players
Parade High School All-Americans (boys' basketball)
Point guards
Portland Trail Blazers players
Quad City Thunder players
Washington Wizards players
21st-century African-American sportspeople
20th-century African-American sportspeople